Byssomerulius is a widely distributed genus of crust fungi.

Taxonomy
Byssomerulius was circumscribed by Estonian mycologist Erast Parmasto in 1967. Although traditionally classified in the family Phanerochaetaceae, recent molecular phylogenetic analysis supports the placement of Byssomerulius  in the Irpicaceae.

Species
Byssomerulius albostramineus (Torrend) Hjortstam (1987) – United States
Byssomerulius armeniacus Parmasto (1967)
Byssomerulius auratus (Bourdot & Galzin) Tura, Zmitr., Wasser & Spirin (2011)
Byssomerulius corium (Pers.) Parmasto (1967) – widespread
Byssomerulius flavidoalbus (Corner) Hjortstam (1995)
Byssomerulius hirtellus  (Burt) Parmasto (1967) – Europe
Byssomerulius incarnatus (Schwein.) Gilb. (1974) – Bolivia
Byssomerulius pavonius (Sw.) Zmitr. & Malysheva (2006) – Brazil
Byssomerulius pirottae (Bres.) Hjortstam (1987)
Byssomerulius psittacinus P.K. Buchanan, Ryvarden & Izawa (2000) – New Zealand
Byssomerulius rubicundus (Litsch.) Parmasto (1967) – Austria; Finland
Byssomerulius salicinus Parmasto (1968)

References

Irpicaceae
Polyporales genera
Taxa described in 1967